Cardington may refer to:

Cardington, Bedfordshire, a village and civil parish in England
Cardington Airfield, the nearby air base that has two vast airship hangars
Cardington, Shropshire, a village and civil parish in England
Cardington, Ohio, a village in the United States
, a Hog Islander laid down in 1917, launched as SS Jolee